Mebolazine (brand names Dostalon and Roxilon; also known as dimethazine, dymethazine, di(methasterone) azine, or 2α,17α-dimethyl-5α-androstan-17β-ol-3-one azine) is a synthetic, orally active androgen/anabolic steroid (AAS) and a 17α-alkylated derivative of dihydrotestosterone (DHT) which is no longer marketed. It has a unique and unusual chemical structure, being a dimer of methasterone linked at the 3-position of the A-ring by an azine group, and reportedly acts as a prodrug of methasterone.

Since 2008, mebolazine has been used illegally as an ingredient is some dietary supplements, including vitamin B supplements, and in the United States the Food and Drug Administration has taken legal action against such manufacturers.

See also
 Bolazine

References

Androgens and anabolic steroids
Androstanes
Organonitrogen compounds
Dimers (chemistry)
Hepatotoxins
Prodrugs
Withdrawn drugs